The September 1995 Ulster Unionist Party leadership election began on 28 August 1995 when James Molyneaux resigned as leader of the Ulster Unionist Party following a year of political setbacks for his party.  Lee Reynolds, a Young Unionist had contested the leadership at the Ulster Unionist Council AGM in March 1995, receiving a small but significant number of votes.  It was widely speculated that David Trimble was one of those behind Reynolds's candidature, although Trimble, his aides and Reynolds's supporters all denied this at the time and subsequently.

The UUP has held a leadership election every March since at least the Ulster Unionist Council constitution was altered in 1973, however it is rarely contested.

Molyneaux's successor was elected by delegates to the Ulster Unionist Council met on 8 September 1995. After three rounds of voting the election was won by David Trimble.

Candidates 

 Ken Maginnis, MP for Fermanagh and South Tyrone
 William Ross, MP for East Londonderry
 Martin Smyth, MP for Belfast South and Grand Master of the Orange Order
 John Taylor, MP for Strangford and a former minister in the Government of Northern Ireland
 David Trimble, MP for Upper Bann who had recently received strong attention for his role in a disputed Orange Order march at Drumcree

Results 

At the meeting delegates to the Ulster Unionist Council voted in a succession of ballots until one candidate had an absolute majority.

After the third round, David Trimble was elected.

Notes

References
Goodson, Dean. Himself Alone: David Trimble and the ordeal of Unionism (London, Harper Perennial, 2004), p. 127.
Goodson, Dean. Himself Alone: David Trimble and the ordeal of Unionism (London, Harper Perennial, 2004), pp. 146–155.

Specific

1995-09
1995 elections in the United Kingdom
1995 in Northern Ireland
1995 elections in Northern Ireland
Ulster Unionist Party leadership election